There have been three baronetcies created for persons with the surname Bernard, one in the Baronetage of England, one in the Baronetage of Great Britain and one in the Baronetage of the United Kingdom. Two of the creations are extinct and one is extant.

The Bernard Baronetcy, of Huntingdon in the County of Huntingdon, was created in the Baronetage of England on 1 July 1662 for Robert Bernard, who represented Huntingdon in the House of Commons. His son, the second Baronet, and grandson, the third Baronet, also represented this constituency in the Parliament. The latter's grandson, the fifth Baronet, sat as Member of Parliament for Huntingdon and Westminster. On his death in 1789 the baronetcy became extinct.

The Bernard Baronetcy, of Nettleham in the County of Lincoln, was created in the Baronetage of Great Britain on 5 April 1769 for Francis Bernard. He was colonial governor of New Jersey and Massachusetts Bay. His younger son, the fourth Baronet, sat as Member of Parliament for Aylesbury and for St Mawes and served under William Pitt the Younger as Under-Secretary of State for the Home Department. In 1789 he assumed by Royal licence the additional surname of Tyringham and in 1811 the surname of Morland in lieu of Tyringham. His younger son, the sixth Baronet, also represented Aylesbury in the House of Commons. On his death in 1883 without surviving male issue, the baronetcy became extinct.

The Bernard Baronetcy, of Snakemoor in the County of Southampton, was created in the Baronetage of the United Kingdom on 27 January 1954 for Dallas Bernard, Deputy Governor of the Bank of England from 1949 to 1954. As of 2010 the title is held by his son, the second Baronet, who succeeded in 1975.

Bernard baronets, of Huntingdon (1662)
Sir Robert Bernard, 1st Baronet (1601–1666)
Sir John Bernard, 2nd Baronet (1630–1679)
Sir Robert Bernard, 3rd Baronet (died )
Sir John Bernard, 4th Baronet (–1766)
Sir Robert Bernard, 5th Baronet (–1789)

Bernard baronets, of Nettleham (1769)
Sir Francis Bernard, 1st Baronet (–1779)
Sir John Bernard, 2nd Baronet (–1809)
Sir Thomas Bernard, 3rd Baronet (1750–1818)
Sir Scrope Bernard-Morland, 4th Baronet (1758–1830)
Sir Francis Bernard-Morland, 5th Baronet (1790–1876)
Sir Thomas Tyringham Bernard, 6th Baronet (1791–1883)

Bernard baronets, of Snakemoor (1954)

Sir Dallas Gerald Mercer Bernard, 1st Baronet (1888–1975)
Sir Dallas Edmund Bernard, 2nd Baronet (born 1926)

There is no heir to the baronetcy.

Notes

References
Kidd, Charles, Williamson, David (editors). Debrett's Peerage and Baronetage (1990 edition). New York: St Martin's Press, 1990, 

Baronetcies in the Baronetage of the United Kingdom
Extinct baronetcies in the Baronetage of England
Extinct baronetcies in the Baronetage of Great Britain
1662 establishments in England